Henry Tennant (1823–1910) was a British railway administrator. He served as general manager of the North Eastern Railway from 1870 to 1891. He was chairman of the Central London Railway from 1895 to 1898 and a director of the company after that.

Locomotive Committee
From 1884 to 1885 the North Eastern Railway was without a Locomotive Superintendent.  During this period the work was done by a Locomotive Committee, chaired by Henry Tennant.  The committee designed the NER 1463 Class 2-4-0 steam locomotive.

References

1823 births
1910 deaths
People educated at Ackworth School
People associated with transport in London
North Eastern Railway (UK) people
19th-century British businesspeople